The 2015 Italian Basketball Supercup was the 21st edition of the super cup tournament in Italian basketball league. Qualified for the tournament were league winners and cup winners Dinamo Sassari, cup finalists Olimpia Milano and league finalist Grissin Bon Reggio Emilia and Reyer Venezia Mestre.

Bracket

Semifinals

Banco di Sardegna Sassari vs. Grissin Bon Reggio Emilia

EA7 Emporio Armani Milano vs. Umana Reyer Venezia

Final

Grissin Bon Reggio Emilia vs. EA7 Emporio Armani Milano

2015
Supercup